Dead Reckoning was a 1990 television film, directed by Robert Michael Lewis, starring Cliff Robertson, Rick Springfield, and Susan Blakely. The film score was composed by Mark Snow. The film was featured on USA Up All Night.

Plot 

The central character, a doctor, finds his life at stake on an island with his wife and her lover.

Cast 
 Cliff Robertson: Daniel Barnard 
 Rick Springfield: Kyle Rath
 Susan Blakely: Alex Barnard
 Linda Darlow: Chi Chi
 Michael MacRae: Sheriff

References

External links
 Dead Reckoning at the Internet Movie Database
 
 

1990 films
1990 television films
Films scored by Mark Snow
Films set on islands
American television films
Films directed by Robert Michael Lewis